Zhav Marg may refer to:
 Zhav Marg-e Mohammad Morad
 Zhav Marg-e Olya
 Zhav Marg-e Sofla